Desyatina is a rural locality (a village) in Pyatovskoye Rural Settlement, Totemsky  District, Vologda Oblast, Russia. The population was 41 as of 2002.

Geography 
Desyatina is located 10 km southwest of Totma (the district's administrative centre) by road. Sovetsky is the nearest rural locality.

References 

Rural localities in Tarnogsky District